Tamerlan Rakhmanovich Ramazanov (born 23 September 1997) is a Russian football player.

Club career
He made his debut in the Russian Professional Football League for FC Anzhi-2 Makhachkala on 19 July 2017 in a game against FC Chernomorets Novorossiysk.

He made his debut for the main squad of FC Anzhi Makhachkala on 20 September 2017 in a Russian Cup game against FC Luch-Energiya Vladivostok.

References

External links
 Profile by Russian Professional Football League

1997 births
People from Suleyman-Stalsky District
Living people
Russian footballers
FC Anzhi Makhachkala players
Association football midfielders
Sportspeople from Dagestan